The following is a list of notable events and releases of the year 1940 in Norwegian music.

Events

Deaths

 November
 6 – Ivar F. Andresen, operatic singer (born 1896).

Births

 February
 15 – Trygve Madsen, composer and pianist.

 March
 20 – Frode Thingnæs, jazz trombonist, composer, music arranger, and conductor (died 2012).

 April
 13 – Bjørn Stokstad, Norwegian clarinettist and architect.
 16 – Ole Jacob Hansen, jazz drummer (died 2000).

 May
 23 – Bjørn Johansen, jazz saxophonist (died 2002).
 30 – Leif Rygg, traditional folk Hardanger fiddler (died 2018).

 August
 6 – Egil Kapstad, jazz pianist, composer and music arranger (died 2017).

 September
 24 – Roald Stensby, rock singer (died 2018).

 October
 14 – Jack Berntsen, philologist, songwriter and folk singer (died 2010).

 November
 6 – Laila Dalseth, jazz singer.

See also
 1940 in Norway
 Music of Norway

References

 
Norwegian music
Norwegian
Music
1940s in Norwegian music